Rachel Lindsay Rene Bush and Sidney Robyn Danae Bush (born May 25, 1970) are American former child actresses, best known for their combined (alternating) role as Carrie Ingalls, in the drama series Little House on the Prairie. They are identical twin sisters, born in Los Angeles to actor Billy Green Bush and Carole Kay Bush. Their older brother, Clay, is also an actor.

Careers 
Prior to Little House on the Prairie debuting on September 11, 1974, they starred in the made-for-television drama Sunshine (1973), as Jill Hayden. In 1978, in the season-five Little House episode "The Godsister", the sisters are shown together playing different characters. The twins' final appearance on the series was on May 10, 1982.

In the final season, their absence was explained by the family (except Laura) moving to Burr Oak, Iowa, to pursue a promising life. Several months later, the series was cancelled. The opening credits of the series showed one of the twins running in a meadow behind the credit "Lindsay Sidney Greenbush", leading many viewers to believe it was one actress's full name. During the course of the series, Sidney had broken her arm several times and it was in a cast. Lindsay did most of the scenes as Carrie.

Post-Little House

In 1983, Lindsay guest starred in a Matt Houston episode as an abuse victim. Sidney starred in the film Hambone and Hillie in 1983. The twins starred in commercials for, among others, Doublemint gum, Mattel Toys, and Kentucky Fried Chicken. The twins decided to retire from acting and continue their studies at public school. They graduated from Santa Monica High in 1988.

Personal lives

Sidney was married to horse breeder William "Rocky" Foster for nine years, until his death at age 55 in 2009.

Lindsay has been married to Daniel Sanchez since 2014. They originally met on the Little House set at Big Sky Ranch in Simi Valley (where exterior scenes were filmed) when she was a small child and he was a teenager who lived nearby. She has said Michael Landon allowed him to watch the filming at Big Sky Ranch. Decades later, they met again and married in the same spot where they first met.

Filmography

External links

References

1970 births
20th-century American actresses
American child actresses
American television actresses
Identical twin actresses
Living people
People from Greater Los Angeles
Actresses from California
American twins
21st-century American women